"Cocaine" is a song written and recorded in 1976 by singer-songwriter J. J. Cale. The song was popularized by Eric Clapton after his cover version was released on the 1977 album Slowhand. J. J. Cale's version of "Cocaine" was a number-one hit in New Zealand for a single week and became the seventh-best-selling single of 1977.

Charts

Eric Clapton version

Glyn Johns produced the Clapton recording, which was released on the 1977 album Slowhand. It was also released as the B-side for "Lay Down Sally".

A live version of "Cocaine" from the album Just One Night charted on the Billboard Hot 100 as the B-side of "Tulsa Time", which was a No. 30 hit in 1980. "Cocaine" was one of several of Cale's songs recorded by Clapton, including "After Midnight" and "Travelin' Light". AllMusic critic Richard Gilliam called it "among [Clapton's] most enduringly popular hits" and noted that "even for an artist like Clapton with a huge body of high-quality work, 'Cocaine' ranks among his best."

Clapton described "Cocaine" as an anti-drug song intended to warn listeners about its addictiveness and deadliness. He called the song "quite cleverly anti-cocaine", noting:

Because of its ambiguous message, Clapton did not perform the song in many of his concerts; over the years, he has added the lyrics 'that dirty cocaine' in live shows to underline the anti-drug message of the song.

Charts

Certifications

See also
List of number-one singles in 1977 (New Zealand)

References

External links

1976 songs
1977 singles
J. J. Cale songs
Eric Clapton songs
Number-one singles in New Zealand
Polydor Records singles
Shelter Records singles
Song recordings produced by Glyn Johns
Songs about cocaine
Songs written by J. J. Cale